Gene William Paul (born August 20, 1944) is an American audio recording / mixing / mastering engineer, producer and musician. He was an engineer at Atlantic Recording Studios during their famed 1960s–80s period and is currently the chief mastering engineer at G&J Audio, a mixing and mastering studio for major and independent labels focused on reissues and new recordings. He has worked on thousands of projects, and has engineered 9 Grammy Award-winning albums with 29 total nominations in 15 different categories. He has engineered many hit recordings, including 7 #1's on the Billboard Pop & Jazz charts, 6 more in the Pop Top 10, 10 more in the Jazz Top 10, and 5 in the R&B Top 20.

Early years

Gene Paul is the son of the guitarist and inventor Les Paul, the inventor of the solid-body electric guitar and early innovator of multitrack recording. Gene spent his youth developing his engineering skills in the family recording studio and spent a decade as the drummer in his father's touring band from 1959 to 1969, with singer Mary Ford (his stepmother) for the first half. "Without even knowing it, I was being taught about presenting music, which was a great experience. I worked on putting the shows together with dad. I watched him record his own music as well as groups. If he said, 'Do you want to know about this?' I'd say, 'Yes.' And I'd go set up a mic. By the time I grew up, I knew how to record."

Atlantic Records

His career took off after joining Atlantic Records in 1969 where he quickly became a world-renowned engineer and producer. "The people there, like Tom Dowd, Arif Mardin, Joel Dorn, Ahmet Ertegun, they were all gentle people. You would think that they were all superstars, but they never acted that way. Being at Atlantic was like being welcomed into someone's house. It was a house of music. You never knew who was going to come in, one day Aretha [Franklin], the next The Modern Jazz Quartet, King Curtis, Gladys Knight. ... It was truthfully hard to go home at night."

Mastering
In the 1980s, Paul began working with Atlantic Records producer Joel Dorn and Atlantic Records engineer Joel Kerr to restore and remaster the recordings of rare live performances by famous artists. This led Paul & Kerr to form DB Plus Digital Services, an independent mastering studio which operated in New York City from 1987 to 2009. In 2010, he became Chief Mastering Engineer at G&J Audio, a mixing and mastering studio for major and independent labels focused on reissues and new recordings, alongside Kerr and engineer Jamie Polaski.

Grammy Awards
Gene Paul has engineered 9 Grammy Award-winning albums with 29 total nominations in 15 different categories. (Years listed are album release dates.)

Recordings
In addition to the Grammy Awards listed above, Gene Paul has engineered many hit recordings, including 7 #1's on the Billboard Pop & Jazz charts, 6 more in the Pop Top 10, 10 more in the Jazz Top 10, and 5 in the R&B Top 20.

References

External links
G&J Audio
Gene Paul on AllMusic
Gene Paul on Artistdirect
Gene Paul on Album Credits
Gene Paul interview by Don Williamson in Jazz Review, Jan. 2006
Gene Paul interview by John Kruth in Wax Poetics, Mar./Apr. 2010
Gene Paul interview by Danny Littwin in Producao Audio, Sept. 2010

1944 births
Living people
Mastering engineers
Atlantic Records
Record producers from California
American audio engineers
20th-century American drummers
American male drummers
20th-century American male musicians